Recently, My Sister Is Unusual (最近、妹のようすがちょっとおかしいんだが) is an anime television series written by Hideyuki Kurata and directed by Hiroyuki Hata. The story follows Mitsuki Kanzaki who comes to have a stepbrother named Yūya. One day Mitsuki is possessed by an angel who calls herself Hiyori who in life had deep feelings towards Yūya. She places a chastity belt on Mitsuki and tells her in order for her to cross over into heaven her final wish to be closer to Yūya must be fulfilled or else both of them will die and go to hell. Mitsuki reluctantly agrees and soon finds herself torn by her feelings for Yūya.

The anime series premiered on Tokyo MX and Sun TV on January 4, 2014, and twelve episodes were aired in total. An OVA was also created for the series that consisted of two short stories in one episode. In May, 2014 a live action film directed by Yuki Aoyama was also made that follows the storyline of the anime with a different ending. When the series first aired it caused a controversy in Japan where a decency investigation was launched. This resulted in censorship of some of the images, and a later time slot for the series. In addition to airing in Japan, the series has been streamed by Crunchyroll, and was licensed by Discotek Media. The series was first released in Japan on DVD, and then later on Blu-ray. The Blu-ray release uses an alternate art cover for the container, and has the episodes uncensored. Outside Japan, the series was released on DVD in North America by Discotek Media on July 28, 2015.

Anime

Live action film

Release and censorship

My Sister is Unusual was first released in DVD format by Imoyco (Kadokawa) from March 26 to August 27, 2014, in total six DVDs were made. Later on in 2014, the series was released in Blu-ray format that has the episodes uncensored with "bubble" artwork that differs from the DVD release cover artwork. An OVA episode was also made, but due to its content it was deemed "too risqué" for television broadcast. Rather than airing it, the episode was only released through the seventh manga volume as a bonus item. The series was also adapted into a live action film that was released in Japan on May 17, 2014. The film stars Tenka Hashimoto, who plays the role of Mitsuki Kanzaki in the anime as well. Outside Japan, Crunchyroll streamed the series with English subtitles. On July 28, 2015 Discotek Media released the series in North America on DVD after acquiring the license, but did not bundle in the OVA episode.

When the anime adaptation of Recently, My Sister is Unusual first aired, it was censored for broadcast. The timeslot chosen to air the episodes had caused controversy in Japan where a decency investigation was launched. The main complaint of the show was Hiyori (one of the main characters) openly talks about masturbation. Following the investigation announcement, Tokyo MX and Sun TV changed the airing time for the episodes to the twilight hours (1:30 - 2:00am local time). The episodes were also censored which included edits to some of the images, while others deemed offensive were blocked out. With the remedies put into place, no additional credible complaints were brought forward. In North America the unrated series was released without the censoring that had been put into place. The English language release has since been withdrawn from production as Discotek Media's distributor Right Stuf Inc. no longer has it available in their inventory.

See also

Overall reception of the series
Oniichan
Incest taboo

References

External links
 Anime official website 
 Anime official website (Tokyo MX) 
 
 Live action film official website (Archived) 
 English sub at Crunchyroll 

Recently, My Sister is Unusual
Anime and manga controversies
Censored television series
Incest in television
Obscenity controversies in animation
Obscenity controversies in television
Self-censorship
Television censorship in Japan